Elysian Fields Quarterly (EFQ) was a literary baseball journal of "writing on baseball from the fan's perspective", published in St. Paul, Minnesota. It featured articles on baseball history and lore.

History and profile
EFQ was founded as The Minneapolis Review of Baseball, by Ken LaZebnik and Steve Lehman. It began publication under its current title in 1992. EFQ was published briefly in 1992–1993 by William C. Brown Company of Dubuque, Iowa, but devolved to its original 'self-published' status after William C. Brown eliminated its baseball division. EFQ ceased to exist in 1995 due to financial difficulties, but was resurrected by Lehman and another contributor in 1998, at the urging of its current publisher, Tom Goldstein. From 1999 through 2007, EFQ annually recognized baseball's "most important book" by bestowing the Dave Moore Award.

EFQ had favorable reviews by the Utne Reader as well as NPR.

In December 2008, Tom Goldstein announced in a letter to subscribers that the publication would be on hiatus during the 2009 season. He added that if EFQ "cannot expand on its narrow base to build a cult-like following … there seems little point in trying to re-start the journal a year from now." As of March 2012, the same announcement remains on its website.

See also
Elysian Fields, Hoboken, New Jersey

References 

"About" page at efqreview.com, Retrieved October 22, 2006.
NewPages Guide to Literary & Alternative Magazines, Retrieved October 22, 2006.
npr.org, 'Writing About Baseball Heaven: "Elysian Fields"', Retrieved October 22, 2006.

Sports magazines published in the United States
Baseball magazines
Defunct magazines published in the United States
Magazines established in 1992
Magazines disestablished in 2009
Magazines published in Minnesota
1992 establishments in Minnesota